The following is a list of municipal presidents of Centro Municipality, Tabasco, Mexico. Centro includes the city of Villahermosa.

List of officials

 José Medardo Rosado, 1930
 Cesar A. Rojas Contreras, 1930-1934
 Juan Palomeque Hernández, 1934
 Ernesto Trujillo Gurría, 1937-1938
 Marcos Buendía Pérez, 1940-1942
 Torcuato Brindis de la Flor, 1943-1945
 Juan Pérez Arrollave, 1946
 Alfonso Sosa Vera, 1949-1952
 Regulo Torpey Andrade, 1953-1955 
 José Guimond Caballero, 1956-1958 
 Mario A. Brown Peralta, 1959-1961 
 Ángel Mario Martínez Zentella, 1962-1964 
 Gustavo Hernández Loroño, 1965 
 Oscar Quintero Martínez de Escobar, 1965-1967 
 Antonio Ocampo Ramírez, 1968-1970 
 Roberto Rosado Sastre, 1971-1973 
 Ramón Magaña Romero, 1974-1976 
 , 1977 
 Agustín Beltrán Bastar, 1977-1979 
 Pascual Bellizia Castañeda, 1980-1982 
 Gustavo Rosario Torres, 1983-1985 
 J. Amador Izundegui Rullán, 1986-1988 
 Cesar A. Rojas Herrera, 1989-1991 
 Manuel Suárez Herrera, 1992-1994 
 Jesús Taracena Martínez, 1995-1997 
 Edgar Azcuaga Cabrera (interim), 1997
 Georgina Trujillo Zentella, 1998-2000 
 Irving Orozco Juárez (interim), 2000 
 Andrés Granier Melo, 2001-2003 
 , 2004-2006 
 José Antonio Compañ Abreu (interim), 2006
 , 2006–2009, 2018-2021 
 Jesús Alí de la Torre, 2010-2011 
 Cuauhtémoc Muñoz Calderas (interim), 2012
 , 2013-2015 
 Francisco Peralta Burelo, 2015
 Gerardo Gaudiano Rovirosa, 2015-2018
 Casilda Ruiz Agustín (interim), 2018

See also
 2006 Tabasco state election
 
 Municipalities of Tabasco
 Timeline of Villahermosa

References

centro
Politicians from Tabasco
History of Tabasco
Municipalities of Tabasco